Truskolasy may refer to:
 Truskolasy, Silesian Voivodeship
 Truskolasy, Świętokrzyskie Voivodeship